Jenny R Lalremliani is an Indian amateur boxer competing at 63 kg. In 2006, she won a gold medal in the Women's World Amateur Boxing Championships.

When not boxing, she works as a police officer in the state of Mizoram.

References

External links
Profile

Living people
1983 births
People from Aizawl
Indian women boxers
Sportswomen from Mizoram
Light-welterweight boxers
AIBA Women's World Boxing Championships medalists